Andrei Bușilă (born 1980) is a Romanian water polo player. At the 2012 Summer Olympics, he competed for the Romania men's national water polo team in the men's event. He is 6 ft 3 inches tall.

References

Romanian male water polo players
1980 births
Living people
Olympic water polo players of Romania
Water polo players at the 2012 Summer Olympics